James Alexander Daugherty (August 30, 1847 – January 26, 1920) was an American politician who was a Democratic U.S. Representative and state judge from southwest Missouri.

Biography 
Daugherty was born in Athens, McMinn County, Tennessee, August 30, 1847.  He moved to Missouri with his parents, who settled near Carterville, Jasper County, in 1867. As an adult he was active in all civic enterprises of the State and county. He also worked in farming, stock raising, and mining and assisted in developing the lead and zinc fields of Missouri.  From 1890-1892 Daugherty held the post of associate judge for the western district of Jasper County, and then became the presiding judge from 1892-1896.

In 1897 Daugherty became a member of the state house of representatives and was elected as a Democrat to the Sixty-second Congress (March 4, 1911 – March 3, 1913). He was an unsuccessful candidate for renomination in 1912.

Simultaneously to this, Daugherty served as president of the First National Bank of Carterville from 1907 to 1920. He was re-appointed as the presiding judge of Jasper County on May 17, 1919 and served until his death.
Daugherty died in Carterville, Jasper County, Missouri, on January 26, 1920 and was interred in Webb City Cemetery, Webb City, Missouri. His large dark granite memorial stone is near the main entrance of the cemetery.

Family 
Daugherty's niece is the famous pediatrician and supercentenarian Leila Denmark.

References

External links

1847 births
1920 deaths
People from Athens, Tennessee
People from Jasper County, Missouri
Democratic Party members of the Missouri House of Representatives
Democratic Party members of the United States House of Representatives from Missouri
Missouri state court judges